George J. O'Shea Jr. (born January 5, 1929) is an American politician who represented the 12th Essex District in the Massachusetts House of Representatives from 1957 to 1963. Outside politics he worked in real estate and insurance. He is the son of state representative George J. O'Shea Sr.

References

1929 births
Democratic Party members of the Massachusetts House of Representatives
Politicians from Lynn, Massachusetts
Boston College alumni
Living people